Keraj Rural District is a rural district (dehestan) in the Central District of Isfahan County, Isfahan Province, Iran. At the 2006 census, its population was 29,032, in 7,453 families.  The rural district has 27 villages.

References 

Rural Districts of Isfahan Province
Isfahan County